Llata District is one of eleven districts of the Huamalíes Province in Peru.

Geography 
Other mountains are listed below:

Ethnic groups 
The people in the district are mainly indigenous citizens of Quechua descent. Quechua is the language which the majority of the population (50.46%) learnt to speak in childhood, 49.12% of the residents started speaking using the Spanish language (2007 Peru Census).

See also 
 K'ipakhara
 Qarwaqucha
 Saqraqucha
 Yanaqucha

References